How I Fell in Love with a Gangster (Polish: Jak pokochałam gangstera) is a 2022 Polish film directed by Maciej Kawulski, written by Krzysztof Gureczny and Maciej Kawulski and starring Tomasz Wlosok, Aleks Kurdzielewicz and Antoni Królikowski.

Cast 
 Tomasz Wlosok as Nikodem 'Nikos' Skotarczak
 Aleks Kurdzielewicz as Young Nikodem Skotarczak
 Antoni Królikowski as 'Komo'
 Agnieszka Grochowska as Milena 'Czarna'
 Magdalena Lamparska as Halina Ostrowska
 Krystyna Janda as Rita
 Klaudiusz Kaufmann as Karl
 Eryk Lubos as 'Kleks'
 Sebastian Fabijański as 'Silvio'
 Julia Wieniawa as Nikita
 Mikolaj Kubacki as Piotr Kamcz
 Dawid Ogrodnik as Andrzej Kolikowski 'Pershing'

References

External links 
 
 

2022 films
2020s Polish-language films
Polish-language Netflix original films
Hood films
Polish drama films
2020s American films